Nannizziopsis arthrosporioides is a keratinophilic microfungus in the family Onygenaceae that causes skin infections in reptiles, producing hyaline, thin-walled, small, sessile conidia and colonies with a strong skunk-like odour. It is distinguished by the production of long arthroconidia.

References

Further reading
Sigler, Lynne, Sarah Hambleton, and Jean A. Paré. "Molecular characterization of reptile pathogens currently known as members of the Chrysosporium anamorph of Nannizziopsis vriesii complex and relationship with some human-associated isolates." Journal of Clinical Microbiology 51.10 (2013): 3338–3357.
Paré, Jean A., and Lynne Sigler. "An overview of reptile fungal pathogens in the genera Nannizziopsis, Paranannizziopsis, and Ophidiomyces." Journal of Herpetological Medicine and Surgery (2016).

External links

Onygenales
Fungi described in 2013